= Eleni Drake =

British-Greek musician

- Origin: Johannesburg, South Africa
- Genres: Indie folk, indie rock
- Years active: 2020-present

Eleni Drake is a British-Greek musician.

== History ==
Drake was born in Johannesburg, South Africa to Greek parents. Drake released her debut album, Can't Stop The Dawn, in 2021. Drake released her second album in 2023 titled Surf The Sun. The album was named one of the best overlooked albums of 2023 from Beats Per Minute. In 2024, Drake released an EP titled Above Deep Water. In 2025, Drake released her latest album titled Chuck.

== Discography ==
Studio albums

- Can't Stop The Dawn (2021)
- Surf The Sun (2023)
- Chuck (2025)

EPs

- Above Deep Water (2024)
